The Shanti Mantras, or "Peace" or Pancha Shanti mantras, are Hindu prayers for peace (shanti) found in the Upanishads. Generally, they are recited at the beginning and end of religious rituals and discourses.

Shanti Mantras are invoked in the beginning of some topics of Upanishads. They are supposed to calm the mind and environment of the reciter. Reciting them is also believed to be removing any obstacles for the task being started.

Shanti Mantras always end with the sacred syllable om (auṃ) and three utterances of the word "shanti" which means "peace". The reason for uttering three times is for calming and removing obstacles in the three realms:

 Physical or Adhi-Bhautika realm can be source of obstacles coming from external world, such as from wild animals, people, natural calamities etc.
 Divine or Adhi-Daivika realm can be source of obstacles coming from extra-sensory world of spirits, ghosts, deities, and demigods.
 Internal or Adhyaatmika realm is source of obstacles arising out of one's own body and mind, such as pain, diseases, laziness, and absent-mindedness.

These are called "Tapa-Traya" or three classes of obstacles. When shanti mantras are recited, obstacles from these realms are believed to be pacified.

These are the Shanti Mantras from the different Upanishads and other sources.

Isha and Brihadaranyaka Upanishad

The translation and meaning of the Mantra can be understood when the context in which the Mantra is quoted in the Upanishad is known. Prior understanding of Vedanta is essential for translation and explanation of these Mantra. The Brihadaranyaka Upanishad explains Consciousness and it in this context that this Shanti Mantra needs to be understood.

Taittiriya Upanishad 

* Reciter = the one who is currently reciting this mantra. Identifying oneself here as "the reciter", and not as "I", is a sign of self-realization, of transcending beyond self and ego being dissolved.

Taittiriya and Katha Upanishad

Kena and Chandogya Upanishads

Aitareya Upanishad

Mundaka, Māndukya and Prashna Upanishads

Vedas
There are various other Shanti Mantras from the Vedas, of which some of the notable ones are:

See also

 Ashtanga vinyasa yoga
 Hindu Astrology
 Inner peace
 Lokaksema (Hindu_prayer)
 Om Namah Shivaya
 Sanctuary (Donna De Lory album)
 The Waste Land
 Vivaah

References

Further reading

 Mantra Pushpam, Text in Sanskrit, compiled by Swami Devarupananda, Published by Ramakrishna Math, Khar, Mumbai, India.
 Brihadaranyaka Upanishad with the Commentary of Shankaracharya, Translated by Swami Madhavananda, Published by Advaita Ashrama, Kolkata, India. ISBN No : 81-7505-102-7
 Eight Upanishads (Vol. 1) with the Commentary of Shankaracharya, Translated by Swami Gambhirananda, Published by Advaita Ashrama, Kolkata, India. ISBN No : 81-7505-016-0
 Eight Upanishads (Vol. 2) with the Commentary of Shankaracharya, Translated by Swami Gambhirananda, Published by Advaita Ashrama, Kolkata, India. ISBN No : 81-7505-017-9
 Vedanta Spiritual Library, 108 Upanishads.
 "The Principal Upanishads" by Swami Sivananda, The Divine Life Society Publications, Uttaranchal, Himalayas, INDIA.

External links
 Commentary by Swami Dayananda Saraswati on Purnamadah(pdf file)

Hindu mantras
Religion and peace